The Nuristanis, formerly known as Kafiristanis, are an ethnic group native to the Nuristan Province of northeastern Afghanistan and Chitral District of northwestern Pakistan. Their languages comprise the Nuristani branch of Indo-Iranian languages. The Nuristanis reside mainly in the northeast of Afghanistan and northwest of Pakistan; between the Pashtun tribes of Kunar, Kalash in Pakistan's Chitral, and Tajiks of Badakhshan in the north.

In the mid-1890s, after the establishment of the Durand Line when Afghanistan reached an agreement on various frontier areas to the British Empire for period of time, Emir Abdur Rahman Khan conducted a military campaign in Kafiristan and followed up his conquest with forced conversion of the Kafirs to Islam; the region thenceforth being known as Nuristan, the "Land of Light". Before their conversion, the Nuristanis practiced a form of ancient Hinduism. Non-Muslim religious practices endure in Nuristan today to some degree as folk customs. In their native rural areas, they are often farmers, herders, and dairymen.

The Nuristan region has been a prominent location for war scenes that have led to the death of many indigenous Nuristanis. Nuristan has also received abundance of settlers from the surrounding Afghan regions due to the borderline vacant location.

Pre-Islamic religion 

Noted linguist Richard Strand, an authority on Hindu Kush languages, observed the following about pre-Islamic Nuristani religion:

"Before their conversion to Islâm the Nuristânis practiced a form of ancient Hinduism, infused with accretions developed locally".

They acknowledged a number of human-like deities who lived in the unseen Deity World (Kâmviri d'e lu; cf. Sanskrit deva lok'a-).

Certain deities were revered only in one community or tribe, but one was universally revered as the creator: the Hindu god Yama Râja called imr'o in Kâmviri. There is a creator god, appearing under various names, as lord of the nether world and of heaven: Yama Rājan, or Māra ('death', Nuristani), or Dezau (ḍezáw) whose name is derived from Indo-European *dheig'h i.e. "to form" (Kati Nuristani dez "to create", CDIAL 14621); Dezauhe is also called by the Persian term Khodaii. There are a number of other deities, semi-gods and spirits. The Kalash pantheon is thus one of the few living representatives of Indo-European religion.

They believed in many deities, whose names resembled those of Iranian and old Vedic sources. There was a supreme deity named Mara or Imra, plus a multitude of lesser gods and goddesses known locally as Mandi or Moni, Wushum or Shomde, Gish or Giwish, Bagisht, Indr, Züzum, Disani, Kshumai or Kime etc. According to Michael Witzel, some of these gods, especially Disani, Moni, and Gish, have direct parallels in Shinto, the native religion of Japan, indicating a shared history dating back to 2000 BCE.

Each village and clan had its guardian deity, with shamans advising those seeking help and priests officiating at religious services. The cult centered on the sacrifice of animals, mostly goats.

The area extending from modern Nuristan to Kashmir was known as "Peristan", a vast area containing a host of Nuristani cultures and Indo-European languages that became Islamized over a long period. Earlier, it was surrounded by Buddhist states and societies which temporarily extended literacy and state rule to the region. The journey to the region was perilous according to reports of Chinese pilgrims Fa-hsien and Sung Yun. The decline of Buddhism resulted in the region becoming heavily isolated. The Islamization of the nearby Badakhshan began in the 8th century and Peristan was completely surrounded by Muslim states in the 16th century. The Kalash people of lower Chitral are the last surviving heirs of the area. 

The region was called "Kafiristan" because while the surrounding populations were converted to Islam, the people in this region retained their traditional religion, and were thus known as "Kafirs" to the Muslims. The Arabic word "Kufr" means disbelief and the related word "Kafir" means one who does not believe in Islam. Thus "Kafir" here is used to refer to their being non-Muslims; the province was therefore known as Kafiristan. The majority were converted to Islam during Abdur Rahman Khan's rule around 1895. The province is now known as Nuristan and the people as Nuristanis. However, among the rural population many old customs and beliefs like occasional production of wine have continued.

History 
In the 4th century BC, Alexander the Great encountered them and finally defeated them after they put up a stubborn and prolonged resistance, describing them as being distinct culturally and religiously from other peoples of the region.

Nuristanis were formerly classified into "Siah-Posh (black-robed) and "Safed-Posh (white-robed)/Lall-Posh (Red-Robed). Timur fought with and was humbled by the Siah-Posh. Babur advised not to tangle with them. Genghis Khan passed by them.

In 1014, Mahmud of Ghazni attacked them:

Timur's encounter with Katirs/Kators 
The first reference to Siah-Posh Kafirs occurs in Timur's invasion of Afghanistan in 1398 CE. Timur's autobiography (Tuzak-i-Timuri) amply attests that he had battled both with the Katirs as well as the Kam sections of the Siah-Posh (black-robed) Kafirs of the Hindukush mountains. Timur invaded Afghanistan in March, 1398. On the basis of local complaints of ill-treatment and extortions filed by the Muslims against the Kafirs, Timur personally attacked the Kators of the Siah-Posh group located north-east of Kabul in eastern Afghanistan. The Kators left their fort Najil and took refuge at the top of the hill. Timur razed the fort to ground, burnt their houses and surrounded the hill where the Kator had collected for shelter. The relic of the historic fort is said to still exist a little north to Najil in the form of a structure known as Timur Hissar (Timur's Fort). After a tough fight, some of the Kators were defeated and were instantly put to death while the others held out against heavy odds for three days. Timur offered them death or Islam. They chose the latter, but soon recanted and attacked the regiment of Muslim soldiers during night. The latter being on guard, fought back, killed numerous Kators and took 150 as prisoners and put them to death afterwards.
Next day, Timur ordered his troops to advance on all four sides to kill all men, enslave the women and children and plunder or lay waste all their property. In his autobiography called Tuzak-i-Timuri, Timur proudly boasts of the towers of the skulls of the Kators which he built on the mountain in the auspicious month of Ramazan A.H. 800 (1300 CE)

Timur's encounter with Kam Kafirs 
Again, according to Timur's autobiography (Tuzak-i-Timuri), a military division of ten thousand Muslim soldiers was sent against the Siah-Posh (Kam) Kafirs under the command of General Aglan Khan to either slay these infidels or else to convert them into Islam. Tuzak-i-Timuri frankly admits that the regiment was badly routed by a small number of Siah-Posh Kafirs. The Muslim forces had to flee from the battle-field leaving their horses and armor. Another detachment had to be sent under Muhammad Azad which fought gallantly and recovered the horses and the armor lost by General Aglan and came back home, leaving the Siah-Posh alone.

It is notable that Timur does not boast of any killings or imprisonment of the Siah-Poshes as he does for the Katirs and numerous other communities of India proper. Also, he gives no further details of his conflict with the Siah-Poshes in his Tuzak-i-Timuri after this encounter, which clearly shows that the outcome of the fight against the Siah-Poshes was very costly and shameful for Timur.

Other references to these Kafirs are made in the fifteenth and later in sixteenth century during the Mughal period.

In 1839, the Kafirs sent a deputation to Sir William Macnaghten in Jalalabad claiming relationship with the fair skinned British troops who had invaded the country

Settlement in Chitral 

At the time of the Afghan conquest of Kafiristan, a small number of Kom and Kati Kafirs fled east to Chitral (modern Pakistan) where they were allowed to settle by the Mehtar. There they practised their faith for a few more decades, before finally converting to Islam as well. The final known non-converted Kafir was settled in a Chitrali village known as Urtsun. This Kafir's name was Chanlu, and he converted in 1938, several months after being interviewed about the cosmology of the Kati.

In Chitral, the Nuristanis are known either as Bashgalis (as most migrated from a valley of Nuristan called Bashgal in the Chitrali Khowar language), or alternatively as Sheikhan (a generic term for recent converts to Islam). The exact population size of Nuristanis in Chitral is unknown, but members of the community estimate that they number at least 12 000. All of them are speakers of the Kamkata-vari language, also known locally as Sheikhani.

Pre-1895 Kafir society 
Prior to 1895, the Kafirs of the Hindu Kush were classified into two groups: the Siah-posh (black clad) and the Safed-posh (white clad) Kafirs, also known as the Lal-posh (red-clad), so-called because of the colour of the robes they wore. But the British investigator George Scott Robertson who visited Kafiristan and studied the Kafirs for about two years (1889–1891) improved upon the old classification by recognising that the Safed-posh Kafirs were actually members of several separate clans, viz, the Waigulis, Presungulis or Viron, and the Ashkuns.  The later three groups of the Kafirs used to be collectively known as Sped-Posh Kafirs.

The term Siah-posh Kafirs used to designate the dominant group of Hindu Kush Kafirs inhabiting the Bashgal Valley. The Siah-posh Kafirs have sometimes been confused with Kalasha people of the neighboring Chitral region in Pakistan.

The Siah-Posh tribe was divided into Siah-posh Katirs or Kamtoz, Siah-posh Mumans or Madugals, Siah-posh Kashtoz or Kashtan, Siah-posh Gourdesh or Istrat, and Siah-posh Kams or Kamoze. The Siah-posh Katirs were further divided into the Katirs, who occupied twelve villages of the lower Bashgul (Kam) country, the Kti or Katawar, who lived in two villages in the Kti Valley, the Kulam, and the Ramguli, the most numerous group, living in twenty four villages in the Ramgul Valley, in the westernmost part of Kafiristan on the Afghan frontier.

All Siah-posh groups of Kafirs were regarded as of common origin. They all had a common dress and customs and spoke closely-related dialects of  Kati. Nicholas Barrington et al. reported that the Waigulis and Presungulis referred to all Siah-posh Kafirs as Katirs.

While the Kamtoz of the lower Bashgul valley were the most numerous, the Kam of the upper Bashgul valley were the most intractable and fierce and dreaded for their military prowess.

Origin hypotheses 
 Some earlier writers had speculated and propagated the myth that the Kafirs of the Hindu Kush may have descended from the army of Alexander the Great. The Pakistani Tourist Bureau still continues to propagate that the peoples in the mountains are descendants of soldiers from the army of Alexander but Greek descent of Kafirs has been discounted by H. W. Bellew, George Scott Robertson and many later scholars. However some other people do believe in their authenticity of this tale that some of the Kalash themselves claim as being descendants of Alexander's army. This list of people who propagate the Kalash's ancestry claim is true includes Sir George Scott Robertson, and Eric S. Margolis.
 The Siah-Posh Kafirs themselves claim to have descended from certain Koresh (Gurashi/Gorish or Goraish) a name linked to Koresh tribe of Arabs but this is merely a fashionable fiction. H. W. Bellew relates name Gurish/Gorish or Koresh of the Kafirs accounts to Kurush and writes that Koresh or Kurush is the national designation of the Kafir tribes of Kafiristan, north of Laghman. Bellew further speculates that Koresh (or Kurush) may have been the family name of the Cyrus, king of Persia who was born in the Cabul country. Keruch, according to Bellew is the name of a Rajput clan which may have been adopted into the Rajput nation though of different race and descent. Thus, Bellew seem to relate Siah-Posh Kafirs to the Iranians.
 George Scott Robertson also rejects Greek origin of the Kafirs. According to him, the present dominant clans of Kafirstan viz. the Katirs (Kamtoz), the Kams (Kamoz) and the Wais are mainly descended from the ancient Indian population of eastern Afghanistan who refused to embrace Islam in tenth century, and fled for refuge from victorious Muslims to the hilly fastnesses of Kafirstan. There they probably found other races already settled, whom they vanquished, drove away, or enslaved, or with whom they amalgamated.
 According to Donald Wilber and other recent writers, anthropological data suggests that the Kafirs are not the tenth century migrants to Kafirstan but are a remnant of original population of the area which according to some was Dravidian but according to the others Indo-Aryan. They appear to be a mixture of an extremely ancient element related to oldest known population of central Himalayas (the Presuns), the element with resemblance to the Kurds and a type with Nordic and Dinaric traits (the Siah-Posh/Wai groups) which goes back to the ancient prototype of these races preserved in the midst of Indo-Aryan ascendancy.

Soviet–Afghan War (1979-1989) 
General Issa Nuristani was second in command following the King during the Soviet invasion of Afghanistan. Before his assassination, General Issa called the Nuristani people in a "Jihad" against the Soviet Army. Led by the Koms tribe, the Nuristani were the first citizens of Afghanistan to revolt against the communist takeover in 1978. They played an important role in the conquering of some provinces, including Kunar, Nangarhar, Badakhshan, and Panshir. Thereafter, Nuristan remained a scene of some of the bloodiest guerrilla fighting with the Soviet forces from 1979 through 1989. Following the withdrawal of the Soviet troops in 1989, the Mawlavy Ghulam Rabani was declared as governor of the Kunar Province. The Nuristanis inspired others to fight and contributed to the demise of the Afghan Communist regime in 1992.

Genetics 
In a 2012 research on Y-chromosomes of five Nuristani samples, three were found to belong to the Haplogroup R1a, and one each in R2a and J2a.

Tribes 

Most Nuristanis are from the Kata Family and Janaderi Branch. However, there are other Nuristani tribes as well, some of the Kata of Janaderi people live in Ozhor (now Karimabad), Gobor, Buburat, Ayun, Broze and Mastuj. There is a very popular rock associated with this tribe located in Karimabad (Juwara) called kata bont (Kata is the name of the tribe; bont meaning "stone" in the Chitrali language).

The Nuristani do not have a formal tribal structure as the Pashtuns do, however they do designate themselves by the names of the local regions they are from. 

In total, there are 35 such designations: five from the north–south valleys and 30 from the east–west valley.

Some of these tribes include:
 Askunu
 Dungulio
 Gramsana
 Jench
 Kata
 Kom
 Kshto
 Mumo
 Sanu

See also 
 Kho people
 Burusho people
 Gurjar
 Dogan (deity)
 Kata-vari dialect

References

Bibliography 

 The Kafirs of the Hindukush, 1896, by George Scott Robertson, Arthur David McCormick, (Oxford in Asia Historical Reprints) - Online :online, 8 copies at Internet Archive.
 Nuristan, 1979, by Lenart Edelberg and Schuyler Jones, Graz, Austria - Online :.
 Afghanistan: its people, its society, its culture (Survey of world cultures), 1962, by Donald Newton Wilber.
 Tribes of the Hindu Kush (Calcutta, 1880) by John Biddulph;
 Kafiristan (Lahore, 1881), Gottlieb William Leitner;
 Aus dem westlichen Himalaya (Leipzig, 1884), K.E. von Ujfalvy;
 The gates of India: Being an historical narrative by Thomas Hungerford Holdich (Unknown Binding - 1977);
 The Indian Borderland, 1880-1900 by Thomas Hungerford Holdich (Paperback - 12 April 2001);
 An account of the Kingdom of Caubul and its dependencies in Persia, Tartary, and India, (comprising a view of the Afghaun nation, and a history of the ... Entdeckungsgeschichte und Geographie Asiens), 1969 Edition, by Mountstuart Elphinstone;
 Proceedings (1869, 1879, 1881, 1884...)... by Royal Geographical Society (Great Britain), Norton Shaw, Francis Galton, William Spottiswoode..;
 The Religions of the Hindukush: The Religion of the Kafirs : The Pre-Islamic Heritage of Afghan Nuristan (The Religions of the Hindukush) by Karl Jettmar (Paperback - Mar 1986);
 A History of Kafferistan: Socio-economic and Political Conditions of the Kaffers, 1989, Amar Singh Chohan;
 Journal of the United Service Institution of India (Simla, 1881), Gottlieb William Leitner;
 Journal of the Royal Asiatic Society, O.S., vol. xix. (London, 1862), Trumpp;
 Zeitschrift der deutschen morgenländischcn Gesellschaft, vol. xx. (Leipzig. 1800);
 The New International Encyclopaedia edited by Daniel Coit Gilman, Harry Thurston Peck, Frank Moore Colby 1911;
 The Encyclopædia Britannica, 1888, Thomas Spencer Baynes;
 Afghanistan, 1956, Donald Newton Wilber - Afghanistan;
 Afghanistan: A Study of Political Developments in Central and Southern Asia, 1967, William Kerr Fraser-Tytler, Michael Cavenagh Gillett - Afghanistan;
 Afghanistan: its people, its society, its culture, 1962, Donald Newton Wilber, Elizabeth E. Bacon - Juvenile Nonfiction;
 Country Survey Series, 1956, Human Relations Area Files, inc - Human geography;
 Geographical and economic studies in the Mahābhārata: Upāyana parva, 1945, Moti Chandra - History;
 The London quarterly review, 1973;
 Memoir on Cuneiform Inscription, 1949, Henry Creswicke Rawlinson;
 Journal of the Royal Asiatic Society of Great Britain & Ireland, 1849, RAS Great Britain and Ireland;
 Die Voelker des oestlichen Asien: Studien und Reisen, 1869, Adolf Bastian, Heinrich Kiepert;
 Ancient geography of India, 1971, Anundoram Borooah;
 Political History of Ancient India, 1996, H. C. Raychaudhury, B. N. Banerjee;
 The Indian historical quarterly, 1949, S Chattopadhyaya, India;
 The Achaemenids and India: By Sudhakar Chattopadhyaya. 2d Rev. Ed, 1974, Sudhakar Chattopadhyaya;
 India as described in early texts of Buddhism and Jainism, 1980, B. C. Law - Tripitaka;
 The geographical dictionary of ancient and mediaeval India, 1979, Nundo Lal Dey - Social Science;
 The Indian historical quarterly, 1936, India;
 Ancient Indian tradition & mythology: Purāṇas in translation, 1969, Jagdish Lal Shastri;
 Ancient Indian Tradition & Mythology: Purāṇas in Translation, 1970, Jagdish Lal Shastri, Arnold Kunst, G. P. Bhatt, Ganesh Vasudeo Tagare;
 Vishnu Purana, H. H. Wilson;
 The Sun and the Serpent: A Contribution to the History of Serpent-worship, 1905, Charles Frederick Oldham;
 Journal of the Royal Asiatic Society of Great Britain & Ireland, 1856, Royal Asiatic Society of Great Britain and Ireland;
 Indian Caste, 1877, p 286, John Wilson; India of To-day, 1906, Walter Del Mar;
 On Yuan Chwang's Travels in India, 629-645 A.D., 1904;
 Publications, 1904, Published by Oriental Translation Fund (Editors T. W. Rhys Davis, S. W. Bushel, London Royal Asiatic Society);
 Ancient Buddhist Monasteries: India and Nepal, 1998, S. Gajrani;
 Journal of Indian History, 1963, University of Kerala Dept. of History, University of Allahabad Dept. of Modern Indian History, University of Travancore, University of Kerala - India;
 Census of India, 1961, India Office of the Registrar General, Office of the Registrar General, India;
 Transaction, Indian Institute of World Culture, Indian Institute of World Culture, Published by Indian Institute of World Culture;
 Journal of Uttara Pradesh Historical Society, Vol XVI, Part II;
 Kāṭhakasaṅkalanam: Saṃskr̥tagranthebhyaḥ saṅgr̥hītāni Kāṭhakabrāhmaṇa, Kāṭhakaśrautasūtra, 1981, Surya Kanta
 The Contemporary Review, Vol LXXII, July-Dec 1897, A. Strahan (etc.), London;
 Bhārata-kaumudī; Studies in Indology in Honour of Dr. Radha Kumud Mookerji, 1945, Radhakumud Mookerji - India).

External links 

 Nuristani Tribal Tree – US Naval Postgraduate School Note: this source has been evaluated as "totally unreliable" by the leading scholarly authorities on Nuristan.
 
 
 
 Richard Strand's Nuristân Site: 

Indo-European peoples
Modern Indo-European peoples
 
Hindu Kush
Chitral District
Ethnic groups in Afghanistan